Johannishögl is a mountain of Bavaria, Germany. It is a sub-peak of Högl.

Mountains of Bavaria
Mountains of the Alps